Niloofar Hamedi is an Iranian journalist who works for the reformist daily newspaper Shargh. She was arrested during the Mahsa Amini protests for breaking the news about Mahsa Amini and reporting on her treatment by Iran's Morality Police. Hamedi is also known for her work as one of the first journalists to have interviewed the family and lawyer for imprisoned writer Sepideh Rashnu, and she published an investigative report on her case.

Report on Mahsa Amini 
On 16 September 2022, Hamedi gained access to Kasra Hospital in Tehran, where 22-year-old Mahsa Amini was being treated following her detention by the morality police for allegedly wearing her compulsory hijab inappropriately. Later that day, and around the time of Amini's death, Hamedi tweeted a photo of Amini's parents hugging and crying in the hospital. That picture quickly spread along with Hamedi's reporting on Amini's death, and eventually spiraled into nationwide protests.

As a result of her news coverage, Hamedi was arrested by security forces on 21 September, following a wave of arrests that targeted journalists and students. Hamedi's Twitter account, where she had originally posted the influential photo of Amini's parents, was suspended without explanation.

According to Hamedi's lawyer, Mohammad Ali Kamfirouzi, she has been interrogated and is being held in solitary confinement at Tehran's Evin Prison. On 4 November 2022, the Islamic Revolutionary Guards accused Hamedi and Elaheh Mohammadi, two female Iranian journalists who had reported on Amini's death, of being United States foreign agents.

See also 
 Compulsory Hijab in Iran
 Iranian protests against compulsory hijab
 Human rights in Iran
 Reactions to the Mahsa Amini protests

Sources 

Living people
Iranian journalists
Iranian women journalists
Iranian prisoners and detainees
1992 births